Rams is a 2020 Australian comedy-drama film directed by Jeremy Sims, written by Jules Duncan, and starring Sam Neill, Michael Caton, and Miranda Richardson. It is based on the Icelandic drama film Rams (2015) by Grímur Hákonarson.

The film premiered at the CinefestOZ Film Festival on 27 August 2020. Rams was released in Australian cinemas on 29 October 2020 to generally positive reviews.

At the 2021 ARIA Music Awards, the album was nominated for Best Original Soundtrack, Cast or Show Album.

Synopsis

Cast
 Sam Neill as Colin
 Michael Caton as Les
 Miranda Richardson as Kat
 Asher Keddie as Angela
 Wayne Blair as Lionel

Production
Rams is the first produced screenplay of writer Jules Duncan, a former TV reporter for Channel 9 and regional network GWN. While the film is based on the Icelandic film of the same name, director Jeremy Sims says the Australian version is a "complete reinterpretation of the original". The film reunites Sims with star Michael Caton and several crew members from his previous feature, Last Cab to Darwin. Caton and co-star Sam Neill previously worked together in the 1976 TV series The Sullivans.

Shooting started on 1 October 2018. All filming took place in Mount Barker, Western Australia. Caton and New Zealander Neill were announced as the film's leads in October 2018. English actress Miranda Richardson joined in November 2018. The production included several Dorset Horn sheep, a rare and endangered breed recognised for their distinctively curved-horns. The film's score is by Antony Partos, an Australian film and TV composer who worked on Animal Kingdom, The Rover and the 2011 TV drama The Slap.

Release
On 17 July 2020, Rams was announced as the opening film of the 2020 CinefestOZ Film Festival. The film premiered at the CineFestOZ Film Festival in Busselton, Western Australia on 27 August 2020.

After numerous delays, Rams was released in Australian cinemas on 29 October 2020.

Reception

Box office
Rams debuted at number one at the Australian box office, earning $568,722 throughout the country on its opening weekend. The film has earned $3,624,786 at the Australian box office with a further $748,290 in New Zealand and $3,705 in Russia, bringing its total worldwide gross to $4,376,781.

Critical reception
Rams has received generally favourable reviews from critics. The site's critical consensus reads, "A rare remake that preserves the heart of the original, Rams draws on the chemistry of its talented veteran stars to explore complicated – and often comedic – sibling ties."

Luke Buckmaster of The Guardian said that, "At the heart of the picture are two very appealing performances from Neill and Caton, who feel even from early moments like real, lived-in characters, well cast to reflect their differences as actors."
Leigh Paatsch of the Herald Sun said, "At times, it is as charming a (blackish) comedy as they come. At others, it is a strikingly well-observed drama."

Accolades

References

External links
 
 
 

2020 films
2020 comedy-drama films
2020s Australian films
2020s English-language films
Australian comedy-drama films
Films about farmers
Films about sheep
Films directed by Jeremy Sims
Films set on farms
Films set in Western Australia
Films set in the 21st century
Films shot in Australia
Remakes of Icelandic films
Roadshow Entertainment films
Screen Australia films